Jana Arnold is a screenwriter, director and producer.

Arnold wrote, directed and produced Bicycle Bobby & Elvis (2009). Her screenplay writer credits include The Sisterhood (2004, starring Barbara Crampton), Witches of the Caribbean (2005, starring Joanna Cassidy), and Stem Cell (2009).

Arnold co-founded, along with Damir Perge, Madman Pictures in Dallas, Texas. Madman Pictures is a film production company. She also co-founded entrepreneurdex, a "venturcelerator" using complexity science to fund and launch start ups.

Filmography 
  Stem Cell (2009)
  Bicycle Bobby (2009)
  Witches of the Caribbean (2005)
  The Sisterhood (2004)

References

External links

 New York Times : The Witches of the Caribbean
 Unspeakable Horror: Interview with Director of Stem Cell

Screenwriters from Kansas
Living people
Year of birth missing (living people)
University of Arkansas alumni
People from Lawrence, Kansas
American women screenwriters
Film directors from Kansas
21st-century American women